Lycorininae is a monotypic subfamily of ichneumon wasps. The mere thirty species or so comprise the single genus Lycorina. In older sources, they may be included in the Banchinae.

They are parasitoids of larval Lepidoptera in leaf rolls. Distribution is worldwide.

Footnotes

References
  (1969): Genera of Ichneumonidae, Part 3 (Lycorininae, Banchinae, Scolobatinae, Porizontinae). Memoirs of the American Entomological Institute 13: 1–307.
  (1978): Ichneumon-flies of America North of Mexico: 7. Subfamily Banchinae, tribes Lissonotini and Banchini. Memoirs of the American Entomological Institute 26: 1–614.
  (1999): Classification and Systematics of the Ichneumonidae (Hymenoptera). Version of 19-JUL-1999. Retrieved 2008-JUN-18.

Ichneumonidae genera